Vigilio Mich (5 March 1931 – 3 August 2019) was an Italian cross-country skier. He competed in the men's 50 kilometre event at the 1956 Winter Olympics.

References

External links
 

1931 births
2019 deaths
Italian male cross-country skiers
Olympic cross-country skiers of Italy
Cross-country skiers at the 1956 Winter Olympics
Sportspeople from Trentino